Ja’afar Abdul El Hakh has been the governor of West Darfur state since 2005. 
He was commissioner of Garsila from 2003 to 2004, had as the highest-ranking official responsibility for the mass executions in Deleig and Garsila in March 2004. He became minister for health for West Darfur in 2004, which he stayed until October 2005. He has been accused of arming the militias fighting the black African Fur.

References

Sudanese politicians
Living people
People from West Darfur
Year of birth missing (living people)